Western Junction is a semi-rural locality and town in the local government area of Northern Midlands in the Central region of Tasmania. The 2016 census determined a population of 125 for the state suburb of Western Junction.

History
Western Junction was gazetted as a locality in 1959.

Geography
The South Esk River forms the southern boundary.

Transport infrastructure

Road
The B41 route (Evandale Road) enters from the north-west and runs through to the south-east before exiting. Route C417 (Perth Mill Road) starts at an intersection with B41 and runs south-west before exiting.

Rail
The junction of the western and southern rail lines is in the locality.

Air
Launceston Airport is within the locality.

References

Localities of Northern Midlands Council
Towns in Tasmania